was a province of Japan in the area of northeastern Shikoku. Sanuki bordered on Awa to the south, and Iyo to the west. In terms of the Gokishichidō system, Sanuki was one of the provinces of the Nankaidō circuit. Under the Engishiki classification system, Sanuki was ranked as one of the "upper countries" (上国) in terms of importance, and one of the "middle countries" (中国) in terms of distance from the capital. The provincial capital was located in what is now the city of Sakaide, but its exact location was only identified in 2012. The ichinomiya of the province is the Tamura jinja located on the city of Takamatsu.

History
In the Kojiki and other ancient texts, this area was called , but was also called "Sanuki" under various spellings. Sanuki Province was formed by the Ritsuryo reforms. The Shiwaku Islands in the Seto Inland Sea were initially considered part of the province, but Shōdoshima and the Naoshima Islands were not transferred from Bizen Province until the Edo Period. In the Heian period, Sanuki was famous for its associations with the Buddhist monk Kūkai as both his birthplace and the place of his early upbringing.  Later, the famed poet Sugawara no Michizane served as governor of the province from 886 to 890 AD. At the end of the Heian period, the Heike clan, which controlled maritime routes on the Seto Inland Sea, has Yashima as one of their main strongholds, but were defeated by Minamoto no Yoshitsune at the Battle of Yashima. In the Muromachi period, the area came under the control of the Hosokawa clan, who were  appointed as shugo by the Ashikaga shogunate. However, in the Sengoku period, the Hosokawa were eclipsed by the Miyoshi clan. The Miyoshi were in turn invaded by Chōsokabe clan from Tosa Province and the Chōsokabe were in turn defeated by Toyotomi Hideyoshi. The province was awarded by Hideyoshi to his general Ikoma Chikamasa,who made Takamatsu Castle his stronghold. 

In the Edo period, Sanuki was divided into five areas; three han, tenryō territory under direct control of the Tokugawa shogunate and a part of Tsuyama Domain whose headquarters was on Honshū.  

Per the early Meiji period , an official government assessment of the nation’s resources, the province had 395 villages with a total kokudaka of 293,628 koku. Sanuki Province consisted of the following districts:

Following the abolition of the han system, Sanuki Province became Kagawa Prefecture in 1872. However, the following year Kagawa was merged with Tokushima Prefecture and the island of Awaji to form . It was separated again on September 5, 1875, but on August 21, 1876 was merged with Ehime Prefecture. It was separated again on December 3, 1888.

Gallery

See also
Sanuki udon – Local type of Udon
Kamatamare Sanuki – Local association football club based in Takamatsu

Notes

References
 Nussbaum, Louis-Frédéric and Käthe Roth. (2005).  Japan encyclopedia. Cambridge: Harvard University Press. ;  OCLC 58053128

External links 

  Murdoch's map of provinces, 1903

Former provinces of Japan
Sanuki Province
History of Kagawa Prefecture
1871 disestablishments in Japan
States and territories disestablished in 1871